The Djembé d’Or is a music award created in 2000, given formerly only to musicians from Guinea, later expanding to include artists from other African countries.

History 
The Djembé d'or has been held annually since 2000, and lasts three days.

Edition 2000 
The first edition awarded the best albums from 1990 to 2000, then the two next editions celebrated popular artists. Since 2004, the contest has begin to award Africans from other countries than Guinea.

Edition 2003 
For three days, Les Ballets Africains, griots, djembéfolas (renowned djembé players) and the stars of showbiz take turns se sont relayés sur la scène devant un parterre de 2 500 spectators, in the presence of the artists Alpha Wess, Sékouba Bambino for Guinea, Barbara Canam, Joëlle C for the Côte d’Ivoire, Alioune N’Der for Senegal and Solo Dja Kabako for Burkina Faso.

The discount of prices for the Palais du peuple de Conakry, took place in the presence of ambassador and ministers.

Volet international

References 

Awards established in 2000
2000 establishments in Guinea